Cycling was contested at the 1986 Asian Games in Olympic Velodrome, Seoul, South Korea from September 21 to September 28.

Medalists

Road

Men

Women

Track

Men

Women

Medal table

References 
 New Straits Times, September 22–29, 1986
 Time trial results

External links 
 Olympic Council of Asia

 
1986 Asian Games events
1986
Asian Games
1986 in road cycling
1986 in track cycling